Luciano Cordeiro (Mirandela, 21 July 1844 – Lisbon, 24 December 1900) was a Portuguese writer, historian, politician and geographer.

Publications
 "Livro de crítica" (Porto, 1869)
 "Segundo Livro de crítica" (1871)
 "De la part prise par les Portugais dans la découverte de l'Amérique" (1875)
 "L'Hydrographie africaine" (1879)
 "Dos Bancos portuguezes" (Lisbon, 1873)
 "Viagens" (1874–1875)
 "Estros e palcos" (1874)
 "Soror Marianna" (1888)

References

External links
 
 

1844 births
1900 deaths
Portuguese male writers
19th-century Portuguese writers
People from Mirandela
19th-century male writers